"Life" is a song by the British pop and soul singer Des'ree. It was the third single from her third album, Supernatural, and was released on 2 June 1998. This song remains Des'ree's biggest hit, peaking at number one in Austria, Hungary, Italy, and the Netherlands, as well as on the UK R&B Chart.

In 2020, the song was covered by Sorenious Bonk and Signe Mansdotter for the Netflix TV show Sex Education.

Lyrics
Taking an "innocuous tone", this playful song mixes "stories about superstitions, phobias and travels around the world". The melody is "upbeat and jubilant". However, the lyrics and rhymes have been widely derided, with the song winning the "worst ever pop lyric" in a 2007 BBC poll, particularly for the verse:

I don't want to see a ghost
It's the sight that I fear most
I'd rather have a piece of toast
Watch the evening news

Critical reception
J.D. Considine for Entertainment Weekly wrote in his review of the Supernatural album, "Whether she's testifying to the inner strengths that make her 'Proud to Be a Dread' or rattling off her insecurities in the drolly upbeat 'Life', Des'ree conveys a depth and complexity that go well beyond what's on the lyric sheet."

Music video
A music video was produced to promote the single, directed by Mike Lipscombe. It features the singer sitting on the back seat of a black 1965 Oldsmobile F-85 Cutlass convertible, driven by a chauffeur. Des'ree is initially sheltered from the sun by a black umbrella, which then flies away. The car passes through sugar cane fields as a crop duster flies overhead, but instead of spraying pesticide, it drops many butterflies.

Track listings

 UK CD1
 "Life" (single version) – 3:28
 "Open Mind" – 4:19
 "Get a Life" – 3:32
 "I'm Kissing You" – 4:52

 UK CD2
 "Life" (long version) – 4:22
 "Life" (Cosmack mix) – 4:25
 "Life" (Cosmack extended mix) – 7:45
 "Life" (Brooklyn Funk R&B mix—no rap) – 5:00

 UK cassette single
 "Life" (single version) – 3:28
 "I'm Kissing You" – 4:52

 European CD single
 "Life" (single version) – 3:28
 "Open Mind" – 4:19

 Australian CD single
 "Life" (single version) – 3:28
 "Open Mind" – 4:19
 "Get a Life" – 3:32
 "Life" (Cosmack mix) – 4:25
 "Life" (Cosmack extended mix) – 7:45

 Japanese CD single
 "Life" (single version)
 "Open Mind"
 "Get a Life"

Charts

Weekly charts

Year-end charts

Certifications

Release history

References

Des'ree songs
1998 singles
1998 songs
550 Music singles
Dutch Top 40 number-one singles
European Hot 100 Singles number-one singles
Music videos directed by Mike Lipscombe
Number-one singles in Austria
Number-one singles in Italy
Number-one singles in Spain
S2 Records singles